Canchis Province is one of thirteen provinces in the Cusco Region in the southern highlands of Peru.

Geography 
The Willkanuta River or Willkamayu is one of the largest rivers of the province. Siwinaqucha, the biggest lake of the province, is also one of the biggest lakes of Peru.

The Willkanuta and La Raya mountain ranges traverse the province. One of the highest peaks of the province is Ausangate. Other mountains are listed below:

History
After independence, the province was created as Tinta Province. On October 14, 1833, it was divided into two new provinces: Canchis Province and Canas Province. On August 29, 1834, the city of Sicuani became the official capital of Canchis Province.

Political division
The province is divided into eight districts (singular: distrito), each of which is headed by a mayor (alcalde). The districts, with their capitals in parentheses, are:

 Checacupe (Checacupe)
 Combapata (Combopata)
 Marangani (Marangani)
 Pitumarca (Pitumarca)
 San Pablo (San Pablo)
 San Pedro (San Pedro)
 Sicuani (Sicuani)
 Tinta (Tinta)

Ethnic groups 
The people in the province are mainly indigenous citizens of Quechua descent. Quechua is the first language of the majority of the population (58.59%), and Spanish of almost all the rest (41.14%).

Archaeological sites 
Raqch'i is an archaeological sites with remains of the Inca period. Other sites in the province are  Ayamach'ay, Llamachayuq Qaqa and Machu Pitumarka.

See also 
 Chukchu
 Ch'illkamayu
 Saqaqaniqucha

Sources

External links
  Official website of the Canchis Province

Provinces of the Cusco Region